Henk Wamsteker can refer to:

 Henk Wamsteker (footballer) (1900–1959), Dutch association footballer
 Henk Wamsteker (rower) (born 1936), Dutch Olympic rower